Frederick Archibald Vaughan Campbell, 3rd Earl Cawdor,  (13 February 1847 – 8 February 1911), styled Viscount Emlyn from 1860 to 1898, was a British Conservative politician. He served briefly as First Lord of the Admiralty between March and December 1905.

Background and education
Cawdor was the eldest son of John Campbell, 2nd Earl Cawdor, and his wife Sarah Mary, daughter of General the Hon. Henry Cavendish. He was educated at Eton and Christ Church, Oxford. He was brought up on the family estates in south Wales and his coming of age in 1868 was a major event in the town of Llandeilo. In 1874 he was appointed to be Deputy Lieutenant for the county of Inverness.

MP for Carmarthenshire
Cawdor was Conservative Member of Parliament for Carmarthenshire from 1874 to 1885. In 1885 the constituency was divided in two and Emlyn decided to contest the new West Carmarthenshire constituency, although most of his family property lay in the eastern part of the county. His chances there appeared to be negligible given the growing industrial population which had been a key factor in the triumph of the Liberal candidate, Edward Sartoris at the 1868 General Election. Emlyn was opposed by the other sitting member, the Liberal W.R.H. Powell, himself a former Conservative supporter, who had first declared his support for the Liberals at the 1874 election. Powell now proclaimed that he had a duty to the Liberal cause to oppose Emlyn.

It was reported that the Conservatives were confident of their chances in West Carmarthenshire, on the grounds that it was largely an agricultural division. However, the electorate had more than doubled in the county, and the 1885 electorate in the Western Division alone exceeded that of the combined county seat in 1880. Powell's victory ended Emlyn's career in Carmarthenshire politics.

Later political career
He succeeded in the earldom in 1898 and served briefly under Arthur Balfour as First Lord of the Admiralty. Lord Cawdor took a leading part in the Conservative opposition to Lloyd George's budget of 1909 and in drafting resolutions for the reform of the House of Lords in 1910.

He was also involved in Pembrokeshire local affairs, and as Chairman of the Great Western Railway from 1895 to 1905 greatly improved the service. In 1904 he was elected unopposed as a member of Pembrokeshire County Council to represent the Castlemartin ward.

Lord Cawdor was an officer in the Royal Carmarthen Artillery, a Militia unit, where he was lieutenant-colonel in command from 24 September 1892 until he retired on 5 November 1902. During these years he was promoted to colonel and appointed an aide-de-camp to King Edward VII.

Family
Lord Cawdor married Edith Georgiana Turnor, daughter of Christopher Turnor, on 16 September 1868. They had ten children. He died in February 1911, aged 63, and was succeeded in the earldom by his eldest son Hugh. Lady Cawdor died in 1926.

References

Kidd, Charles, Williamson, David (editors). Debrett's Peerage and Baronetage (1990 edition). New York: St Martin's Press, 1990,

External links 

1847 births
1911 deaths
Alumni of Christ Church, Oxford
Emlyn, Frederick Campbell, Viscount
Deputy Lieutenants of Inverness-shire
Earls in the Peerage of the United Kingdom
Lord-Lieutenants of Pembrokeshire
First Lords of the Admiralty
Members of the Privy Council of the United Kingdom
Members of Carmarthenshire County Council
Emlyn, Frederick Campbell, Viscount
Emlyn, Frederick Campbell, Viscount
Cawdor, E3
Directors of the Great Western Railway
3
Presidents of the Marylebone Cricket Club
Carmarthen Militia officers
Members of the Parliament of the United Kingdom for Cricklade
People educated at Eton College